Yevgeni Aleksandrovich Mayorov  (11 February 1938 – 10 December 1997) was an ice hockey forward who played in the Soviet Hockey League for HC Spartak Moscow. He won the world title in 1963 and an Olympic gold medal in 1964. In 1963 he was inducted into the Russian and Soviet Hockey Hall of Fame.

Mayorov started playing for Spartak in 1956, together with his twin brother Boris. They won two Soviet titles, in 1962 and 1967. In 1967, Yevgeny retired from competitions to become a coach with Spartak, but returned to play for the Finnish club Vehmaisten Urheilijat Tampere in the 1968–69 season. In 1969–1976 he headed Spartak Moscow, and since late 1960s also worked as a sports commentator on television. From 1982, until his death in 1997, he was a full-time hockey commentator and journalist with Gosteleradio, the Soviet national broadcasting company. In 1998, he was named the best sports commentator of the year.

References

External links
 Russian and Soviet Hockey Hall of Fame bio

1938 births
1997 deaths
HC Spartak Moscow players
Ice hockey players at the 1964 Winter Olympics
Medalists at the 1964 Winter Olympics
Olympic gold medalists for the Soviet Union
Olympic medalists in ice hockey
Olympic ice hockey players of the Soviet Union
Ice hockey people from Moscow
Recipients of the Medal of the Order "For Merit to the Fatherland" II class
Honoured Masters of Sport of the USSR
Soviet ice hockey coaches
Burials at Vagankovo Cemetery
Russian ice hockey players
Russian sports journalists
Sports commentators
Ice hockey commentators
Soviet sports journalists